Ajax Icefall' is an icefall between Stenhouse Bluff and Ullmann Spur at the head of Visca Anchorage, King George Island, in the South Shetland Islands. Charted by the French Antarctic Expedition under Jean-Baptiste Charcot in 1908–10. Named by the United Kingdom Antarctic Place-Names Committee in 1960 for HMS Ajax, which assisted in the search for a boat crew from the Discovery II, missing on King George Island in January 1937.

Sources

Icefalls of Antarctica
Landforms of King George Island (South Shetland Islands)
Bodies of ice of the South Shetland Islands